Gaston Sant Blanc (1759–1820) was a self-educated French watchmaker, the founder of the Sant Blanc watch and jewelry company.

References

French clockmakers
1759 births
1820 deaths